This article talks about transportation in the Bahamas, a North American archipelagic state in the Atlantic Ocean.

Highways
Approximately  of road in the Bahamas is classified as highway. Drivers drive on the left.

Ports and harbours

Marinas and harbours are plentiful on The Bahamas islands, making aquatic travel an easy way to navigate between the islands group. Boat travel can be the only way to reach some of the smaller islands. Travelers entering the island will need to clear customs first,  but boatsmen can enter any of the following ports of entry and harbours in The Bahamas:
 Abaco Islands: Green Turtle Cay, Marsh Harbour, Spanish Cay, Treasure Cay, or Walker's Cay
 Berry Islands: Chub Cay and Great Harbour Cay
 Bimini: Alice Town
 Cat Cays: Hawksnest Marina
 Eleuthera: Governor's Harbour, Harbour Island, Rock Sound, or Spanish Wells
 Exuma: George Town
 Grand Bahama Island: Freeport Harbour, Lucayan Marina Village and Port Lucaya, or Old Bahama Bay at West End
 Inagua: Matthew Town
 Long Island: Stella Maris Airport
 Mayaguana: Abraham's Bay
 Nassau/New Providence Island: Any marina
 San Salvador: Cockburn Town

Facilities catering to large passenger cruise ships are located on Grand Bahama Island and New Providence.  The Lucayan Harbour Cruise Facility in Freeport and Nassau harbour's Prince George Wharf are built specifically to handle multiple modern cruise ships at one time.  Additionally, several major cruise line corporations have each purchased an uninhabited island which they now operate as private island destinations available exclusively to their respective ships.  These include Great Stirrup Cay, owned by Norwegian Cruise Line, Little Stirrup Cay otherwise known as Royal Caribbean International's "Coco Cay", Carnival Corporation's Little San Salvador Island or "Half Moon Cay", and Castaway Cay, of Disney Cruise Line.  Of these, only Castaway Cay offers ships an actual pier for docking.  The others use tender boats to service ships anchored off shore.

Merchant marine

Total: 1,440 (2017 - CIA World Factbook)
By type: bulk carrier 335, container ship 53, general cargo 98, oil tanker 284, other 670 (2017)

The Bahamas are one of the world's top five flag of convenience shipping registries.

Airports

The main airports on the islands are Lynden Pindling International Airport on New Providence, Grand Bahama International Airport on Grand Bahama Island, and Marsh Harbour International Airport on Abaco Island. Out of 62 airports in all, 23 have paved runways, of which there are two that are over 3,047 meters long.

Airports with paved runways:
total: 23
over 3,047 m: 2
2,438 to 3,047 m: 4
1,524 to 2,437 m: 11
914 to 1,523 m: 6 (2008)

Airports with unpaved runways:
total: 39
1,524 to 2,437 m: 5
914 to 1,523 m: 12
under 914 m: 22 (2008)

Airlines

Bahamasair is the national flag carrier airline of the Bahamas.

Heliports
A heliport is located on Paradise Island, as well as other smaller islands, such as the various cruise line private islands.

Railways

Today, there are no functioning railways in the Bahamas. However there have been a few in the past including in Inagua, Abaco, and Grand Bahama. These were used for the salt and logging industries. The most famous of these was at Wilson city in Abaco, where the Bahamas timber company and Owens Illinois built a large city for the purpose of logging. They operated three locomotives, being a Vulcan 2-6-0, a Vulcan 0-4-4 tank, and a shay locomotive built at Lima locomotive works in Ohio. Only one train remains at Wilson city, as a rusting hulk out on the beach. After Wilson city shut down at the end of the First World War, the island of Abaco was extensively logged by the Bahamas Cuban company until 1940, when they moved to Pine ridge in Grand Bahama. In Inagua, the Morton salt company used small Brookville diesel locomotives to pull trains of salt around the area. The locomotives were phased out eventually, but the tracks remained for a few more years before being removed due to contamination issued with the salt. There have been a handful of smaller railways which operated without locomotives. There were built for the purpose of transporting salt, sisal, and agricultural produce. These existed in Little Abaco, Exuma, Inagua (Inagua tramways, 1860s), cat island, and New Providence. https://commons.m.wikimedia.org/wiki/File:Bahamas_timber_company_locomotive.jpg

References

External links

Transportation in the Bahamas
Road Traffic Department of the Bahamas